"Rock & Roll" is a song by American singer-songwriter Eric Hutchinson, and the first single released from his major-label debut album Sounds Like This. The song was used in the movie The Sisterhood of the Traveling Pants 2, and was included in the soundtrack. It was also used as the song to end the final episode of 2008 series of Packed to the Rafters, and was included in the Platinum selling soundtrack. The music video was released in early 2008.

Track listing

Charts

Weekly charts

Year-end charts

Certifications

Release history

References 

2008 singles
2008 songs
Warner Records singles